The 2012 Original 16 WCT Bonspiel was held from November 9 to 11 at the Calgary Curling Club in Calgary, Alberta as part of the 2012–13 World Curling Tour. The event was held in a round robin format, and the purse for the event was CAD$22,000. In the final, Steve Petryk defeated Robert Schlender with a score of 6–3.

Teams
The teams are listed as follows:

Round-robin standings
Final round-robin standings

Tiebreakers

Playoffs
The playoffs draw is listed as follows:

References

External links

2012 in Canadian curling
Sport in Calgary